The 1964 Michigan State Spartans football team represented Michigan State University in the 1964 Big Ten Conference football season. In their 11th season under head coach Duffy Daugherty, the Spartans compiled a 4–5 overall record 3–3 against Big Ten opponents) and finished in sixth place in the Big Ten Conference.

Two Spartans were selected as first-team players on the 1964 All-Big Ten Conference football team. Halfback Dick Gordon received first-team honors from the Associated Press (AP) and United Press International (UPI), and tackle Jerry Rush received first-team honors from the AP. Rush was also selected as a second-team All-American by the AP.

Schedule

Game summaries

Michigan

Coming into the game, Michigan had lost six straight games to the Spartans and had not defeated them since 1955. The game matched two teams ranked in the Top 10 in the AP Poll and attracted "the largest crowd ever assembled at Spartan Stadium" up to that time. Writing in The New York Times, R. W. Apple, Jr., wrote that the intrastate rivalry "means to the people of Michigan what the struggle between the Capulets and Montagues did to the citizens of 15th-century Verona."

Michigan State scored its only touchdown in the first quarter after recovering a fumble recovery off an errant pitch from Timberlake to Anthony. Another highlight for Michigan State came when sophomore receiver Gene Washington impressed observers with "a spectacular leaping grab for 43 yards."

Trailed 10 to 3 halfway through the fourth quarter, Michigan scored 14 points in the final seven minutes on a comeback led by sophomore halfback Rick Sygar. With seven minutes remaining, Sygar caught a five-yard touchdown pass from Timberlake. On the final drive, he took a pitch from Timberlake at the Michigan State 31-yard line and threw a touchdown pass to John Henderson. Having missed a two-point conversion attempt on the first Michigan touchdown, Timberlake threw to Steve Smith for the two-point conversion on the final score. Michigan defeated the Spartans 17–10. Mel Anthony rushed for 70 yards on 21 carries, and John Henderson had 82 receiving yards on three catches.

References

Michigan State
Michigan State Spartans football seasons
Michigan State Spartans football